Hungary will competes at the 2007 World Championships in Athletics with 11 athletes.

Competitors

References

Nations at the 2007 World Championships in Athletics
World Championships in Athletics
Hungary at the World Championships in Athletics